The 1973 Intercontinental Cup was the inaugural edition of the long-running international baseball tournament. It was held in Italy.

Bruno Beneck, president of the Italian baseball federation (FIBS) was dissatisfied with the Latin American predominance of the worldwide governing body for the sport of baseball, the International Baseball Federation (IBAF, which was called FIBA at the time). Beneck formed a splinter group called FEMBA, which organized the  tournament.

Final standings

Notes

Intercontinental Cup (baseball)
1973
1973 in baseball
1973 in Italian sport